Hydrelia luteosparsata is a moth in the family Geometridae first described by Sterneck in 1928. It is found in China.

References

Moths described in 1928
Asthenini
Moths of Asia